The 2017 WNBA season for the Washington Mystics of the Women's National Basketball Association is scheduled to begin May 13, 2017. The Mystics got off to a strong start, posting a 10–5 record in May and June.  After a 4–4 July, the Mystics struggled to finish out the season.  A 4–6 finish saw them place third in the Eastern Conference, and earn the 6th overall seed in the playoffs.  Strong performances from star players allowed the Mystics to win in the First Round over the Dallas Wings and in the Second Round over the New York Liberty.  In the Semifinals, the Mystics were swept by the Minnesota Lynx 0–3.

The Mystics became the first Washington-based professional sports team to reach the semifinal stage of playoffs since they themselves did so in 2002. They and the  NHL's Washington Capitals reaching the Finals in 1998 were the only instances of a Washington-based team reaching the semifinals since the Redskins' 1991 Super Bowl.

Transactions

WNBA Draft

Trades
  Elena Delle Donne is acquired from the Chicago Sky in exchange for Stefanie Dolson, Kahleah Copper and Washington’s first round pick (second overall) in the 2017 WNBA draft.
 Bria Hartley and Kia Vaughn were traded to the New York Liberty.
 The 2nd round draft pick (15th overall) was traded to the Seattle Storm.

Roster

Game log

Preseason

|- style="background:#bbffbb;"
| 1 || May 2 || Indiana || W 87-67  || Taylor (13) || Hawkins (7) || Tied (3) || Indiana Farmers Coliseum4,336 || 1-0
|- style="background:#fcc;"
| 2 || May 8 || Minnesota || L 59-75 || Hawkins (14) || Hawkins (7) || Latta (4) || Verizon Center1,426 || 1-1

Regular season 

|- style="background:#bbffbb;"
| 1
| May 14
| San Antonio
| W 89-74
| Dell Donne (24)
| Ruffin-Pratt (9)
| Meesseman (8)
| Verizon Center6,126
| 1-0
|- style="background:#fcc;"
| 2
| May 19
| Los Angeles
| L 89-99
| Dell Donne (27)
| Tied (4)
| Cloud (8)
| Staples Center12,127
| 1-1
|- style="background:#fcc;"
| 3
| May 21
| Seattle
| L 71-81
| Dell Donne (14)
| Ruffin-Pratt (8)
| Toliver (3)
| KeyArena6,088
| 1-2
|- style="background:#bbffbb;"
| 4
| May 24
| Chicago
| W 82-67
| Dell Donne (21)
| Ruffin-Pratt (10)
| Toliver (5)
| Allstate Arena6,714
| 2-2
|- style="background:#bbffbb;"
| 5
| May 26
| Chicago
| W 88-79
| Dell Donne (20)
| Thomas (10)
| Tied (5)
| Verizon Center6,438
| 3-2
|- style="background:#bbffbb;"
| 6
| May 31
| Connecticut
| W 78-76
| Hill (18)
| Dell Donne (12)
| Hill (8)
| Verizon Center5,393
| 4-2

|- style="background:#bbffbb;"
| 7
| June 4
| Atlanta
| W 78-72
| Dell Donne (23)
| Dell Donne (15)
| Tied (4)
| Verizon Center5,320
| 5-2
|- style="background:#bbffbb;"
| 8
| June 6
| Dallas
| W 101-89
| Dell Donne (23)
| Tied (8)
| Cloud (6)
| College Park Center  2,805
| 6-2
|- style="background:#fcc;"
| 9
| June 9
| Minnesota
| L 73-98
| Hill (20)
| Taylor (7)
| Tied (2)
| Verizon Center6,518
| 6-3
|- style="background:#bbffbb;"
| 10
| June 11
| Indiana
| W 88-70
| Dell Donne (25)
| Thomas (14)
| Toliver (4)
| Verizon Center6,194
| 7-3
|- style="background:#fcc;"
| 11
| June 18
| Dallas
| L 83-87
| Hill (21)
| Hawkins (7)
| Tied (4)
| Verizon Center7,285
| 7-4
|- style="background:#fcc;"
| 12
| June 23
| Minnesota
| L 76-93
| Hill (21)
| Dell Donne (8)
| Tied (1)
| Xcel Energy Center9,723
| 7-5
|- style="background:#bbffbb;"
| 13
| June 25
| Chicago
| W 97-63
| Hill (17)
| Thomas (12)
| Cloud (6)
| Allstate Arena5,344
|  8-5
|- style="background:#bbffbb;"
| 14
| June 27
| Seattle
| W 100-70
| Dell Donne (25)
| Tied (12)
| Tied (4)
| Verizon Center7,337
| 9-5
|- style="background:#bbffbb;"
| 15
| June 29
| New York
| W 67-54
| Tied (15)
| Dell Donne (9)
| Hill (3)
| Verizon Center5,490
| 10-5

|- style="background:#fcc;"
| 16
| July 2
| Los Angeles
| L 69-76
| Dell Donne (22)
| Thomas (7)
| Hill (3)
| Staples Center9,185
| 10-6
|- style="background:#fcc;"
| 17
| July 5
| Phoenix
| L 80-88
| Dell Donne (15)
| Thomas (10)
| Tied (3)
| Talking Stick Resort Arena7,440
| 10-7
|- style="background:#fcc;"
| 18
| July 8
| Connecticut
| L 92-96
| Dell Donne (28)
| Tied (6)
| Toliver (7)
| Mohegan Sun Arena6,073
| 10-8
|- style="background:#bbffbb;"
| 19
| July 14
| Indiana
| W 72-58
| Meesseman (15)
| Ruffin-Pratt (11)
| Meesseman (3)
| Bankers Life Fieldhouse8,007
| 11-8
|- style="background:#fcc;"
| 20
| July 16
| New York
| L 55-85
| Meesseman (19)
| Thomas (10)
| Tied (2)
| Madison Square Garden10,204
| 11-9
|- style="background:#bbffbb;"
| 21
| July 19
| Atlanta
| W 100-96
| Toliver (29)
| Thomas (17)
| Cloud (8)
| Verizon Center15,597
| 12-9
|- style="background:#bbffbb;"
| 22
| July 25
| San Antonio
| W 85-76
| Dell Donne (29)
| Thomas (13)
| Toliver (10)
| AT&T Center9,244
| 13-9
|- style="background:#bbffbb;"
| 23
| July 30
| Atlanta
| W 77-70
| Meesseman (30)
| Thomas (15)
| Tied (3)
| McCamish Pavilion4,185
| 14-9

|- style="background:#fcc;"
| 24
| August 4
| San Antonio
| L 74-76
| Toliver (18)
| Thomas (20)
| Tied (6)
| AT&T Center4,955
| 14-10
|- style="background:#bbffbb;"
| 25
| August 6
| Phoenix
| W 85-80
| Toliver (20)
| Thomas (16)
| Tied (3)
| Verizon Center7,414
| 15-10
|- style="background:#bbffbb;"
| 26
| August 12
| Indiana
| W 100-80
| Thomas (20)
| Thomas (14)
| Meesseman (7)
| Capital One Arena7,337
| 16-10
|- style="background:#fcc;"
| 27
| August 16
| Los Angeles
| L 62-95
| Meesseman (20)
| Meesseman (7)
| Tied (3)
| Capital One Arena7,279
| 16-11
|- style="background:#fcc;"
| 28
| August 18
| Phoenix
| L 79-89
| Toliver (21)
| Tied (8)
| Toliver (4)
| Capital One Arena  7,208
| 16-12
|- style="background:#bbffbb;"
| 29
| August 20
| Indiana
| W 87-82
| Tied (18)
| Thomas (11)
| Ruffin-Pratt (4)
| Bankers Life Fieldhouse  7,593
| 17-12
|- style="background:#fcc;"
| 30
| August 25
| New York
| L 66-74
| Thomas (17)
| Thomas (9)
| Dell Donne (4)
| Madison Square Garden9,340
|17-13
|- style="background:#fcc;"
| 31
| August 26
| Dallas
| L 78-83
| Dell Donne (29)
| Dell Donne (11)
| Toliver (5)
| Capital One Arena  8,656
| 17-14
|- style="background:#fcc;"
| 32
| August 29
| Connecticut
| L 76-86
| Dell Donne (24)
| Dell Donne (16)
| Toliver (6)
| Capital One Arena  10,953
| 17-15

|- style="background:#bbffbb;"
| 33
| September 1
| Seattle
| W 110-106
| Dell Donne (37)
| Thomas (12)
| Toliver (8)
| Capital One Arena  11,567
| 18-15
|- style="background:#fcc;"
| 34
| September 3
| Minnesota
| L 72-86
| Toliver (20)
| Thomas (14)
| Toliver (3)
| Xcel Energy Center  10,321
| 18-17

Playoffs

|- style="background:#bbffbb;"
| 1
| September 6
| Dallas
| W 86–76
| Dell Donne (25)
| Thomas (17)
| Meesseman (5)
| Capital One Arena  6,483
| 1–0

|- style="background:#bbffbb;"
| 1
| September 10
| New York Liberty
| W 82–68
| Toliver (32)
| Dell Donne (10)
| Tied (4)
| Madison Square Garden  9,538
| 1–0

|- style="background:#fcc;"
| 1
| September 12
| Minnesota
| 
| Dell Donne (17)
| Dell Donne (6)
| Toliver (6)
| Williams Arena7,834
| 0–1
|- style="background:#fcc;"
| 2
| September 14
| Minnesota
| 
| Tied (25)
| Thomas (7)
| Toliver (6)
| Williams Arena9,033
| 0–2
|- style="background:#fcc;"
| 3
| September 17
| Minnesota
| 
| Dell Donne (15)
| Dell Donne (8)
| Toliver (5)
| Capital One Arena  7,950
| 0–3

Standings

Playoffs

Awards and honors

References

External links
The Official Site of the Washington Mystics

Washington Mystics seasons
Washington
Washington Mystics